Parker's spinetail (Cranioleuca vulpecula) or the white-breasted spinetail, is a species of bird in the family Furnariidae. It is found in Bolivia, Brazil, Ecuador, and Peru.

Its natural habitats are subtropical or tropical moist lowland forest and subtropical or tropical moist shrubland.

References

Parker's spinetail
Birds of the Amazon Basin
Birds of the Ecuadorian Amazon
Birds of the Peruvian Amazon
Parker's spinetail
Parker's spinetail
Parker's spinetail
Taxonomy articles created by Polbot